Bojan Šaranov (Serbian Cyrillic: Бојан Шаранов; born 22 October 1987) is a Serbian professional footballer who plays as a goalkeeper for Greek Super League club Lamia, for which he is captain.

Club career

OFK Beograd
Born in Vršac, Šaranov started out at OFK Beograd, making his senior debuts in the 2004–05 season, aged 17. He subsequently went on loan to Mačva Šabac, Bežanija, and Rudar Pljevlja in order to gain first team experience. After consecutive loan spells, Šaranov returned to OFK Beograd and became the first-choice goalkeeper following Radiša Ilić's departure in the 2009 winter transfer window.

Šaranov missed just two games in the 2009–10 Serbian SuperLiga, helping the side earn a 3rd-place finish and secure a spot in the 2010–11 UEFA Europa League. In the following 2010–11 campaign, Šaranov was named in the league's Team of the Season due to his performances in the process.

Maccabi Haifa
In June 2011, Šaranov moved abroad and signed with Israeli champions Maccabi Haifa. He made his official debut for the club on 27 July 2011, being substituted by Nir Davidovich at half-time in an eventual 2–1 home win over Slovenian side Maribor. On 20 August 2011, Šaranov made his first league appearance for Maccabi Haifa in a 4–1 away success at Maccabi Netanya. He also collected five appearances in the 2011–12 UEFA Europa League group stage.

On 24 October 2013, Šaranov saved two penalties taken by Miroslav Stoch, but failed to prevent his team's 2–3 loss away at PAOK in Group L of the Europa League. He again missed just one game in the group stage, as the team finished in third place. In his third season at Maccabi Haifa, Šaranov made a career-high 38 appearances in all competitions.

Ergotelis
On 30 December 2014, Šaranov signed with Greek side Ergotelis. He saved a penalty from Alejandro Domínguez in a 0–3 away league loss against Olympiacos on 14 February 2015. Until the end of the 2014–15 Superleague Greece, Šaranov recorded 13 appearances, before leaving the club following their relegation from the top flight.

Partizan
In the 2016 winter transfer window, Šaranov returned to Serbia and joined Partizan. He helped the side win the Serbian Cup in May 2016. On 31 August 2016, Šaranov terminated his contract with Partizan by mutual consent.

Qarabağ
Shortly after leaving Partizan, Šaranov joined Azerbaijani club Qarabağ. He mostly served as the team's third-choice goalkeeper behind Ibrahim Šehić and Şahruddin Məhəmmədəliyev in the 2016–17 season, as Qarabağ won the double.

Later career
In September 2017, Šaranov joined Serbian SuperLiga newcomers Zemun on a free transfer. He immediately established himself as a first team regular, collecting 12 league appearances in the first half of the 2017–18 season under manager Milan Milanović. In January of the following year, Šaranov switched to fellow SuperLiga club Radnički Niš. On 13 July 2018, he signed a year contract with Super League club Lamia for an undisclosed fee. On 28 February 2019, Šaranov saved the resulting spot-kick from Kostas Fortounis  which was destined for his left corner, five minutes before the final whistle, sealing a shocking 1-0 away Greek Cup win against giants Olympiakos and advanced to the semi-finals of the Greek Cup 4-3 on aggregate.

International career
In March 2008, Šaranov was included in the preliminary squad for the 2008 Summer Olympics, but failed to make the final cut for the tournament. He was subsequently selected to represent Serbia at the 2009 UEFA Under-21 Championship. Serving as a backup for Željko Brkić, Šaranov was unable to make any appearance in the tournament.

In March 2011, Šaranov received his first call-up to the Serbia national team by manager Vladimir Petrović ahead of a UEFA Euro 2012 qualifier versus Northern Ireland. He eventually made his full international debut for Serbia on 3 June 2011, playing the full 90 minutes in a 1–2 friendly loss away against South Korea.

Career statistics

Club

International

Honours

Club
OFK Beograd
 Serbia and Montenegro Cup: Runner-up 2005–06
Partizan
 Serbian Cup: 2015–16
Qarabağ
 Azerbaijan Premier League: 2016–17
 Azerbaijan Cup: 2016–17

Individual
 Serbian SuperLiga Team of the Season: 2010–11

Notes

References

External links
 
 
 

1987 births
Living people
Serbia and Montenegro footballers
Serbian footballers
OFK Beograd players
FK Mačva Šabac players
FK Bežanija players
FK Rudar Pljevlja players
Maccabi Haifa F.C. players
Ergotelis F.C. players
FK Partizan players
Qarabağ FK players
FK Zemun players
FK Radnički Niš players
PAS Lamia 1964 players
Fatih Karagümrük S.K. footballers
People from Vršac
Serbia international footballers
Serbia under-21 international footballers
First League of Serbia and Montenegro players
Serbian First League players
Serbian SuperLiga players
Israeli Premier League players
Super League Greece players
Azerbaijan Premier League players
Serbian expatriate footballers
Expatriate footballers in Montenegro
Expatriate footballers in Israel
Expatriate footballers in Greece
Expatriate footballers in Azerbaijan
Expatriate footballers in Turkey
Serbian expatriate sportspeople in Montenegro
Serbian expatriate sportspeople in Israel
Serbian expatriate sportspeople in Greece
Serbian expatriate sportspeople in Azerbaijan
Serbian expatriate sportspeople in Turkey
Association football goalkeepers